Roberto Gomes Júnior, known as just Roberto, is an athletic goalkeeper who serves on the GO.

Career
Roberto started his career in athletic rival, Goias, through basic categories and professional. In 2010 he left for rival Goiás Atlético-GO.

Contract
 Atlético Goianiense.

References

External links
zerozerofootball.com

1990 births
Living people
Brazilian footballers
Atlético Clube Goianiense players
Campeonato Brasileiro Série A players
Association football goalkeepers